The Israeli occupation of the West Bank began on 7 June 1967, when Israeli forces captured and occupied the territory (including East Jerusalem), then ruled by Jordan, during the Six-Day War, and continues to the present day. The status of the West Bank as a militarily occupied territory has been affirmed by the International Court of Justice and, with the exception of East Jerusalem, by the Israeli Supreme Court. The official view of the Israeli government is that the laws of belligerent occupation do not apply to the territories, which it claims are "disputed", and it administers the West Bank, excepting East Jerusalem, under the Israeli Civil Administration, a branch of the Israeli Ministry of Defense. Considered to be a classic example of an "intractable" conflict, the length of Israel's occupation was already regarded as exceptional after two decades, and is now the longest in modern history. Israel has cited several reasons for retaining the West Bank within its ambit: a claim based on the notion of historic rights to this as a homeland as claimed in the Balfour Declaration of 1917; security grounds, both internal and external; and the deep symbolic value for Jews of the area occupied.

Perhaps the most closely researched modern conflict, controversies abound even as to what terminology is the most appropriate, with pro-Israeli sources favouring one set of terms and the Palestinian National Authority advocating a different nomenclature. Disputes arise over the bias of keywords, and whether the Israeli or Palestinian viewpoint dominates media representations.

Israel has controversially, and in contravention of international law, established numerous Jewish settlements throughout the West Bank. The United Nations Security Council has consistently reaffirmed that settlements in that territory are a "flagrant violation of international law", most recently in 2016 with United Nations Security Council Resolution 2334. The creation and ongoing expansion of the settlements have led to Israel's policies being criticized as an example of settler colonialism.

Israel has been accused of major violations of international human rights law, including collective punishment, in its administration of the occupied Palestinian territories. Israeli settlers and civilians living or traveling through the West Bank are subject to Israeli law, and are represented in the Knesset; in contrast, Palestinian civilians, mostly confined to scattered enclaves, are subject to martial law and are not permitted to vote in Israel's national elections. This two-tiered system has inspired comparisons to apartheid, with many likening the dense disconnected pockets that Palestinians are relegated to with the segregated Bantustans that previously existed in South Africa when the country was still under all-white rule. Israel, the United States, other countries and scholars reject the comparison, while several human rights organizations and other countries and scholars consider Israel to be guilty of the crime of apartheid.

The occupation also has numerous critics within Israel itself, with some Israeli conscripts refusing to serve due to their objections to the occupation.

The language of conflict and coverage in academia and the media

Terminology bias, it has been argued, is written into reportage about the Israeli–Palestinian conflict, with concerns over language manipulation often expressed, with Peter Beinart even suggesting there was a pattern of Orwellian "linguistic fraud and a culture of euphemism" at work, what others have called "sanitized terminology." Each party has its preferred set of descriptive words. The word "occupation", once current, has slipped from view in US mainstream reportage, and is almost taboo. A survey of British newspapers readers in 2001 found that only 9% knew that Israel occupied the Palestinian territories. International usage speaks of the West Bank, whereas Israeli usage prefers Judea and Samaria, and it treats the territory, excepting East Jerusalem, as the Israeli district Judea and Samaria Area; the IDF "says" or "confirms" while Palestinians "claim"; for Israelis, violence is an interruption of the status quo, for Palestinians it is an everyday feature of the occupation; what Palestinians and the international community generally consider to be targeted assassinations are "pinpoint preventive operations" for Israel; what some call "colonies" are called "settlements" or "neighbourhoods" by others; what some call "displacement" is for Palestinians "dispossession". Violence by Palestinians is regularly labeled terrorism whereas Israeli military actions are reported as "retaliation" for Palestinian attacks, while the context before the latter is often omitted, lending credence to the idea Israel never initiates violence.

The way the conflict is reported are extensively monitoring and analysed: in addition to Israel's public diplomacy, intent on countering negative press images, there are also many private pro-Israeli organizations, among them CAMERA, FLAME, HonestReporting, Palestinian Media Watch, Canary Mission and the Anti-Defamation League which claim much reportage is distorted. The term Pallywood was coined to suggest that Palestinian coverage of their plight is manipulative fake news. John Mearsheimer and Stephen Walt have argued that United States media coverage, compared to other countries, tilts strongly in Israel's favour. This view that American media are biased against Palestinians has been challenged by authors who cite research that concluded most mainstream media have a "liberal" bias, a criticism extended to European outlets like Le Monde and the BBC.

The quality of both media coverage of the Arab–Israeli conflict and research and debates on university campuses have been the object of extensive monitoring and research. In the latter regard, organizations like Campus Watch closely report and denounce what they consider "anti-Israeli" attitudes. Academics like Sara Roy have argued on the other hand that "the climate of intimidation and censorship surrounding the Israeli-Palestinian conflict, both inside (at all levels of the education hierarchy) and outside the U.S. academy, is real and longstanding". Attempts have been made to silence several high-profile critics of Israeli policies in the territories, among them Tony Judt, Norman Finkelstein, Joseph Massad, Nadia Abu El-Haj and William I. Robinson. Such difficulties have given rise to anxieties that the topic itself is at risk, and that the political pressures circumscribing research and discussion undermine academic freedom itself.

Internal Israeli studies have argued that local press coverage has traditionally been conservative, reflecting the often tendentious and biased views of the political and military establishment, and similar tendencies have been noted in Palestinian reportage. Tamar Liebes, former director of the Smart Institute of Communication at the Hebrew University, argued that Israeli "Journalists and publishers see themselves as actors within the Zionist movement, not as critical outsiders". The explosive expansion of the Internet has opened up a larger sphere of controversy, with digital forensics on social networks occasionally revealing problems with a few widely circulating images of dead Palestinians, but, also led to the emergence of militant social media practitioners who maintain fraudulence was natural for Palestinians and that images of their dead and wounded were generally faked.

The West Bank in 1967

Israel's economy was 10 times larger than the West Bank's on the eve of the occupation but had experienced two years of recession. The West Bank's population stood between 585,500 and 803,600 and, during the Jordanian rule accounted for 40% of Jordan's GNP, with an annual growth rate of 6-8%. Ownership of land was generally collective, and the 19th century Ottoman land code prevailed, which classified land as either – waqf, mülk, miri, matruke, and mawat – the last three being formally state land, though Jordan never considered these last three as state property, and only a very small proportion of the West Bank was registered as such under Jordanian rule.

Education was (and remains) a high priority, The enrolment rate averaged an annual increase of 7% over the prior decade, and by 1966, Palestinian youth had the highest enrolment rate of all Arab countries. Palestinians in the West Bank had a favourable educational basis compared to Israeli Arabs and Jordanian youth, due to the preexisting provisions of the Jordanian school system which provided 12 years of free and compulsory education. with some 44.6% of West Bank teenagers in the 15–17 age group participating in some form of secondary schooling.

Conquest

Johan Galtung states that the Arabs consider Palestine to be the only Arab land that has been denied Arab rule and independent statehood.
In 1956, the Israeli leader David Ben-Gurion stated that: "Jordan has no right to exist. The territory to the West of the Jordan should be made an autonomous region of Israel". There had been a very strong opposition to any "Balkanization" or division of Palestine, especially among American Zionists, in the mid-late thirties, since it would have made a prospective homeland, thus truncated, suicidally small. It was in this context that Ben-Gurion argued forcefully for accepting partition agreements as temporary measures, steps on the way to an incremental incorporation of all of Palestine into a Jewish state. According to Israeli historian Adam Raz, as early as 1961, the IDF had drawn up meticulous plans for the conquest and retention of not only the West Bank, but also the Sinai Peninsula and Gaza Strip from Egypt, and the Golan Heights from Syria. In August 1963, within the framework of "expected directions of expansion," southern Lebanon up to the Litani River was also included. Though international pressure might foreseeably force Israel to evacuate these conquered lands, contingency plans envisaged also political circumstances whose development would enable Israel to maintain control of these occupied territory indefinitely. The model for controlling Palestinians in the West Bank, were this to eventuate, was to be modeled on the Israeli governance of their Palestinian communities under a strict regime of permits.

Before the Six-Day War, there had been an unwritten agreement between Israel and the Jordanian government to uphold the neutrality of the border between the two countries along the Green Line. According to King Hussein, after Israel retaliated against Syrian-backed guerrilla infiltrations and sabotage by conducting on 13 November 1966 an assault on Samu in the West Bank, an area administered by Jordan, that tacit accord was broken. After Israel attacked Egypt at 8 a.m. on 5 June 1967, Jordan responded by shelling Israeli targets in West Jerusalem, and settlements along the border and then, after ignoring an Israeli warning, by attacking Israeli airfields in Ramat David and Kfar Syrkin, but also Netanya. In response, the Israeli army in a swift campaign took possession of East Jerusalem and, after news that King Hussein had ordered his forces to withdraw across the Jordan, took the entire West Bank by noon on 8 June.

Israel expelled many people from areas it had conquered, beginning with an estimated 12,000 people who on the very first day were rounded up in the villages of Imwas, Yalo and Bayt Nuba in the Latrun Salient and ordered by the Israeli military into exile eastwards. All three villages were then blown up, and within two years the area was planned as a recreational area now called Canada Park. Tens of thousands of Palestinians fled to Jordan from the refugee camps of Aqabat Jaber and Ein as-Sultan after Israel bombed the camps. The overall numbers of Palestinians displaced by that war is generally estimated to have been around 280,000-325,000, of which it has been calculated that some 120–170,000 were two-time refugees, having been displaced earlier during the 1948 war. The number who left the West Bank as a consequence of the war ranges from 100,000 to 400,000, of which from 50,000 to 200,000 lived in the Jordan Valley.

Military-Civil Administration

During the 1967 June War Israel appointed a Military Governor to rule the West Bank, with a remit to retain Jordanian law except where these conflicted with Israel's rights as belligerent occupying power. The Israeli administration of Palestinian territories became in time "the longest – and, accordingly, the most entrenched and institutionalized – belligerent occupation in modern history", issuing from 1967 to 2014 over 1,680 military orders regarding the West Bank. The third military order, issued two days after the onset of the occupation, specified that military courts were to apply the provisions of the Fourth Geneva Convention regarding the protection of civilians in a war zone: within 4 months this stipulation was erased from the order. Jordan maintains that some of the laws ostensibly retained from its code, stemming from the Mandatory Defence (Emergency) Regulations of 1945, had in fact been abolished, and were invalid as they conflicted with the Fourth Geneva Convention of 1949. The Israeli Military Governorate was dissolved in 1981, and in its place the Israeli military established the Israeli Civil Administration. The military order establishing the Israeli Civil Administration, military order 947, specified that "the Civil Administration shall administer civilian affairs ... with regard to the welfare and benefit of the population." Meron Benvenisti argues that this transition marked the transformation of the occupation from a temporary into a permanent system.

The military closely supervised elections in local clubs, cooperatives or charitable organizations. West Bank lawyers were banned on security grounds from organizing professionally a bar association. Palestinians were denied direct political representation after 1976, and instead, village leagues (rawabit al-qura) were introduced, and furnished by Israeli with arms and militias. These leagues had a short life: their appointees were considered to be quislings by General Binyamin Ben-Eliezer and collaborationists by the local population, and to have been recruited from people who were lazy or had criminal backgrounds. With the Oslo Accords, Israel negotiated with the Palestinian Liberation Organization a provisory agreement which left the latter some autonomy in Area A, mixed regulation of Area B, and total Israeli administration of the largest zone, Area C. Israel retains a right to operate militarily in all three zones, but security issues have a bilateral dimension that had led a number of critics to argue that effectively the Palestinian National Authority has become Israel's subcontractor in the occupation. According to an analysis by the Israeli think tank Molad in 2017, Israel deploys from 50% to 75% of its active IDF forces in the West Bank, while only one third deals with Arab states, Iran, Hezbollah, Hamas and other perceived external threats 80% of the former defend settlements, while 20% handle any behavior that Israel considers a security threat, including terrorism.

Israeli security concerns
A concern for security in Israel has been said to "vastly exceed the norm for other Western countries". Israel's military-industrial sector, which by the early 1980s employed a quarter of all industrial workers with 28% of GNP devoted to defense expenditures, became the fastest growing sector of the economy after 1967. It came to extend its activities beyond issues of defense, spilling over into the administration and settlement of the occupied territories.

The occupation has, according to some Israeli researchers, produced an ethos of conflict of which perceived security concerns, at times perplexing to outsiders, are a central feature. Although security is a fundamental Israeli preoccupation, the state has never formalized an official national security policy or doctrine. Before June 1967, the Israeli cabinet did not regard the West Bank as having a "vital security value". Before the war ended, the IDF's research department under Shlomo Gazit drew up a proposal to pullback almost completely from the West Bank and Gaza in exchange for a peace treaty, since, they concluded, there was no need for retaining any territory on security grounds. The document was ignored. It was in the wake of the conquest, that secure defensible borders became a keynote of Israel's foreign policy.

Four schools of thought came to dominate the question of the acquired territories. Two were closely linked to strategic questions of security. The territorialist approach, associated with Yigal Allon's Allon Plan (1967–1970), would have annexed all of the West Bank south of Jerusalem and the lowland border along the Jordan River, and excluded areas closer to the pre-1967 border, which had a high density of Palestinians. The functionalist view, associated with Moshe Dayan and later Simon Peres, foresaw setting up 5 army bases along the Jordan ridges, which also left the Palestinians in between with a degree of autonomy, though constrained to accept the presence of Israelis among them. From 1968 to 1977 Labour governments facilitated a number of settlements designed to form a bulwark against the threat of future mass tank assaults from Jordan and Iraq.

The third approach, associated with Menachem Begin and the Likud party, is annexationist, and with the ascendency of Likud, the biblical resonance of West Bank territory outweighed questions of security significance in driving an expansion of settlements, though both Likud and Gush Emunim came to oppose Palestinian independence on security grounds and treated West Bank Palestinians as either potential enemies or security threats, by arguing that national autonomy would develop into a basis for PLO aggression. The fourth position, associated with Abba Eban, Pinhas Sapir and Yehoshafat Harkabi is reconciliationist, being opposed to the idea of "Fortress Israel". Its proponents do not generally consider retention of the West Bank indispensable for guaranteeing Israel's security interests, with Harkabi, a former head of military intelligence, advocating withdrawal to the 1967 borders in exchange for a negotiated settlement with the PLO.

The West Bank was considered a bargaining chip in securing a broad peace treaty with Arab nations. In time, especially after the Sinai withdrawal, and suggestions the Golan Heights were also negotiable, the idea of retaining territory for strategic interests dwindled in importance, as a military anachronism in an age of missile warfare. The military arguments for retaining ground were supplanted by political considerations, that Arab acquiescence in agreed on borders is of greater importance, and that settlements, formerly placed along possible invasion routes, were no longer functional for security, if they were an obstacle to peace. The Oslo Accords, moreover, had set in place a Palestinian security apparatus that, as Yitzhak Rabin acknowledged, worked with Israel to safeguard Israel's security interests.

According to analysts who support Israeli settlements, the presence of hostile, armed forces on the high ground of the West Bank would pose a security risk to the narrow Israeli land between the West Bank and the Mediterranean coast, which contains some of the country's biggest strategic assets, including Ben Gurion airport, the largest electric power station, and highly-populated cities. Over half of the Israeli public believes settlements reinforce Israel's security. In recent years, numerous top defense experts disagree, dismissing the idea as a myth or outdated illusion. 106 retired Israeli Generals, such as Eyal Ben-Reuven, Moshe Kaplinsky and Gadi Shamni, and Shin Bet heads such as Yuval Diskin have publicly opposed Benjamin Netanyahu's claim that an independent state of Palestine would be a security threat, arguing variously that holding millions of Palestinians under occupation on ostensible security-related grounds, rather than pursuing an overall peace plan with Arab countries, endangers Israel's future.

Territory

Israel extended its jurisdiction over East Jerusalem on 28 June 1967, suggesting internally it was annexed while maintaining abroad that it was simply an administrative move to provide services to residents. The move was deemed "null and void" by the United Nations Security Council. The elected Arab council was disbanded, and a number of services provided by Palestinian companies were transferred to their Israeli competitors. The population ratio for this united Jerusalem was set ideally as 76% Jewish and 24% Arab, and Jewish Israeli settlers were given a 5-year tax exemption, not applied to Palestinian Jerusalemites, who were placed in a high income tax bracket, and paid for 26% of municipal services while receiving 5% of the benefits. The Palestinian areas were encircled by Jewish new town developments which effectively closed them off from expansion, and services to the latter were kept low so that after decades, basic infrastructure was left in neglect, with shortages of schools, inadequate sewage and garbage disposal. By 2017, 370,000 lived in the overcrowded Arab areas, living under strict restrictions on their daily movement and commerce. One 2012 report stated that the effect of Israeli policies was that, amidst flourishing modern Jewish settlements, the Arab sector had been allowed to decay into a slum where criminals, many of them collaborators, thrived. In 2018 legislative measures were announced to strip a further 12,000 Palestinians of their right to live in East Jerusalem.

Israel's policies regarding the use of land in the rest of the West Bank display three interlocking aspects, all designed around a project of Judaization of what was Palestinian territory. These policies consist in (a) planning for land use (b) expropriations of land and (c) the construction of settlements.

Area C

The "Letters of Mutual Recognition" accompanying the "Israel-PLO Declaration of Principles on Interim Self-Government Arrangements" (the DOP), signed in Washington on 13 September 1993, provided for a transitional period not exceeding five years of Palestinian interim self-government in the Gaza Strip and the West Bank. Major critics of these arrangements, headed by Raja Shehadeh, argue that the PLO had scarce interest or competence in the legal implications of what it was signing.

These Oslo Accords ceded nominal control of a small amount of the West Bank to a Palestinian authority, with a provisory division of the land, excluding East Jerusalem, into 3 areas: Area A (18% of territory, 55% of population), Area B (20% of territory, 41% of the population), and Area C (62% of territory, 5.8% of population). Israel never finalized the undertaking with regard to Area C to transfer zoning and planning from the Israeli to the Palestinian authorities within five years and all administrative functions continued to remain in its hands. Tactically, the Accord lessened Israel's problem with large-scale demonstrations since the areas of ostensible PA control were fragmented into 165 islands containing 90% of the Palestinian population, all surrounded by the spatially contiguous 60% of the West Bank where the PA was forbidden to venture. Israel then reasserted in 2000 a right to enter, according to "operational needs", Area A where most West Bank Palestinians live and which is formally under PA administration, meaning they still effectively control all the West Bank including areas under nominal PA authority.

According to the United Nations special rapporteur on Human Rights in the Palestinian Territories, Michael Lynk, the policies applied by Israel indicate an intention to annex totally Area C, which has 86% of the nature reserves, 91% of the forests, 48% of the wells and 37% of the springs in the West Bank.

Early economic impact of occupation
The early occupation set severe limits on public investment and comprehensive development programmes in the territories. British and Arab commercial banks operating in the West Bank were closed down soon after Israel assumed power there. Bank Leumi then opened nine branches, without successfully replacing the earlier system. Farmers could get loans, but Palestinian businessmen avoided taking out loans from them since they charged 9% compared to 5% interest in Jordan. Land confiscations led to rural labour seeking employment, even if mainly menial, in Israel, causing a labour scarcity in the West Bank, and their remittances were the major factor in Palestinian economic growth during the 1969-73 boom years.

The Israeli licensing system stipulated no industrial plant could be built without obtaining a prior Israeli permit, which was often tied to security concerns. Entrepreneurs were denied a permit for a cement factory in Hebron, melon production was forbidden, imports of grapes and dates banned, to protect Israeli farmers, and limits were set to how many cucumbers and tomatoes could be produced. Israeli milk producers exerted pressure on the Ministry for Industry and Trade to stop the establishment of a competitive dairy in Ramallah. Ian Lustick states that Israel "virtually prevented" Palestinian investment in local industry and agriculture. Two decades later, 90% of West Bank imports came from Israel, with consumers paying more than they would for comparable products had they been able to exercise commercial autonomy.

Land seizure mechanisms

In 1968 a military order stopped attempts by Palestinians to register their land, while permitting Israel to register areas as state land with its own Custodian of Enemy Property. Whereas Ottoman and British Mandatory Authorities had used property-tax books to collect taxes from villages, Israel ignored these as evidence of ownership, demanding instead that proof be given the land was under cultivation, while army seizures often prevented villagers from continuing to work their fields. From 1967 to 1983, Israel expropriated over 52% of the West Bank, most of its prime agricultural land and, by the eve of 1993 Oslo Accords, these confiscations had encompassed over three-quarters of the territory. The mechanisms by which Israel seizes or expropriates West Bank land were set forth in a detailed work by B'Tselem in 2002. Many practices outlined there were confirmed in the official Israeli Sasson Report of 2005, which focused on government subsidies and support for the creation of illegal Israeli outposts in knowing contravention of Israel's own laws.

Under international law, a military may take temporary possession of occupied land, but not expropriate it. From 1957 to 1976 the IDF repeatedly requisitioned private Palestinian properties on the grounds of military necessity, only to turn them over for Jewish settlements, such as Matitiyahu, Neve Tzuf, Rimonim, Bet El, Kokhav Hashahar, Alon Shvut, El'azar, Efrat, Har Gilo, Migdal Oz, Gittit, Yitav and Qiryat Arba. This practice, after Palestinians appealed, was blocked by the High Court in the case of Elon Moreh (1979). Thereafter, the Ottoman Land Law of 1858, which enabled the sovereign to seize certain types of land, though much private land had not been registered to avoid taxes or military service with the Ottomans, was reactivated. Thirdly, land temporally abandoned during the 1967 was deemed absentee property came under trusteeship, but since Israel rarely allows refugees to return, instances where land is restored to its rightful owners are few and far between. If a claim is made, but the Custodian has sold it to a settler group in the meantime, the sale cannot be nullified even if invalid. Fourthly, land expropriated for public need under Jordanian law required notification, time for appeal, and royal approval. Israel modified this by delegating the power to regional military commanders, and by abolishing the requirement to publish the intention to expropriate in an official gazette. Appeals were dealt with no longer in local courts but by the military court system. Lastly, land sales were subject to severe restrictions, except for purchases by the Jewish National Fund. Since Palestinians regard sale of their land to Jews as treasonable, the law was altered to enable Jewish buyers to withhold registration of property acquired from Palestinians for 15 years. Many fraudulent practices in this regard flourished until they were formally stopped by law in 1985.

One estimate put the amount of unalienable Islamic property dedicated to pious ends confiscated by Israel at over 600,000 dunams.

Settlement

Ariel Sharon viewed the primary function of settling the West Bank as one of precluding the possibility of the formation of a Palestinian state, and his aim in promoting the 1982 invasion of Lebanon was to secure perpetual control of the former. As of 2017, excluding East Jerusalem, 382,916 Israelis have settled in the West Bank, and 40% (approximately 170,000 in 106 other settlements) live outside the major settlement blocs, where 214,000 reside.

A continuity has often been observed between the Realpolitik processes governing the creation of Israel and the practices adopted with regard to the West Bank. Several analysts have likened the process to enclosure – the "establishment of exclusionary Jewish spaces on the Palestinian landscape" being heir to the English appropriation of common land and its conversion to private use – or to the conversion of Amerindian land into "white property".

Early Zionist policy for land appropriation was outlined by Menachem Ussishkin in 1904 and, aside from voluntary sales, foresaw the need also to seize land by war and compel sale through expropriation via the ruling authority. It called this practice "colonization", a word which, since 1967, has been replaced by the euphemism "settlement."

The technique developed over the decades of early settlement was one of incremental spread, setting up tower-and-stockade outposts, a pattern repeated in the West Bank after 1967. A quote attributed to Joseph Trumpeldor summed up Zionist logic: "Wherever the Jewish plow plows its last furrow, that is where the border will run". The principle of this slow steady establishing of "facts on the ground" before the adversary realizes what is going on, is colloquially known as "dunam after dunam, goat after goat". The model applied to the West Bank was that used for the Judaization of the Galilee, consisting of setting up a checkered pattern of settlements not only around Palestinian villages but in between them. In addition to settlements considered legal, with government sponsorship, there are some 90 Israeli outposts (2013) built by private settler initiatives which, though illegal even in Israeli terms, are defended by the IDF. From the mid-1990s to 2015 many of these, such as Amona, Avri Ran's Giv'ot Olam and Ma'ale Rehav'am – the latter on 50 dunams of private Palestinian land – were directly funded, according to Haaretz, by loans from the World Zionist Organization through Israeli taxpayer money, since its approximate $140 million income derives from Israel and is mostly invested in settlements in the West Bank.

The first site chosen for settlement was Gush Etzion, on some  worked by Palestinian refugees. Hanan Porat was inspirational, intending by developing the settlement in order to put in place a practical application of the radical messianic Zionism of Rabbi Zvi Yehuda Kook, whose father Abraham Isaac Kook's Mercaz HaRav yeshiva in particular has exercised considerable influence on Israel's policies regarding the West Bank. According to Eyal Benvenisti, a 1972 judgement by Supreme Court justice Moshe Landau, siding with a military commander's decision to assign electrical supply in the Hebron area to the Israel Electric Corporation rather than to a Palestinian company, was to prove pivotal to encouraging the settlement project, since it placed the latter under the jurisdiction of the military authorities.

During the first decade of Israel occupation, when the Israeli Labour Party held power, settlement was concentrated on constructing a ring of "residential fortresses" around the Palestinian population of Jerusalem, and in the Jordan Valley. According to Ibrahim Matar, the purpose of this colonizing strategy around Jerusalem was to hem in and block the expansion of the Palestinian population, and to incentivize Palestinian emigration by inducing a sense among the Palestinians a sense of living in a ghetto.

Between 1967 and 1977, settlement was small-scale totaling the transfer of 3,200 Israelis into the West Bank. By the end of Labour's term of power in 1977, 4,500 Israelis had established themselves in 30 West Bank settlements and some 50,000 in settlements in East Jerusalem. It was with the rise to power of Menachem Begin's Likud Party, driven by a "Greater Israel theology"  that year, which led to an incremental expansion of this projects, and marked in the view of Oren Yiftachel the peak of Israel's ethnocratic project, with the West Bank to become "the bedrock of Jewish national identity". A change in territorial focus took place, with settlements now promoted in the biblical heartland of the West Bank next to Palestinian population centres. The main plank of Likud's platform, still unaltered, called for the immediate annexation of the West Bank. If security calculations influenced the relatively small-scale settlements advanced by the Israeli Labour Party, the reconfirmation of Likud in 1981 led to a rapid escalation of settlement as a religious-national programme.

The local Palestinian press was forbidden by the military censors at the same time from reporting any news about settlements, expropriations or legal moves made to block them. By 1983, settlers in the West Bank numbered 28,400. Incentives consisting of government mortgage and housing subsidies, tax incentives, business grants, free schooling, infrastructure projects, and defense were provided. After the Oslo Accords down to 2002, the settler population doubled.

In 1972 the number of Israeli settlers in Area C were 1,200, in 1993 110,000, and in 2010 310,000 (excluding East Jerusalem). Before 1967 there were between 200,000 and 320,000 Palestinians in the Jordan Valley, which, together with the northern Dead Sea, covers 30% of the West Bank and constituted the "most significant land reserve" for Palestinians, 85% of whom are barred from entering it. By 2011, 37 settlements had been established among the 64,451 Palestinians there (who constitute 29 communities) 70% of whom live in Area A in Jericho. According to ARIJ, by 2015 only 3 of 291 Palestinian communities in Area C received Israeli building approval (on just 5.7 hectares), and any construction outside that was subject to demolition. In that one year, they calculate, Israel confiscated a further 41,509 hectares, demolished 482 homes – displacing 2,450 people – uprooted 13,000 trees, and subjected Palestinians and their property to assault on some 898 distinct occasions. Israeli settlements constituted 6% of the land, while military zones had been declared over 29%.

From 1967 to 2003, successive Israeli governments assisted the transfer of some 230,000 Jewish civilians into 145 West Bank and Gaza settlements and approximately 110 outposts. By 2016, approximately 42% of the settlement workforce (55,440) found employment in those settlements. The ultra-Orthodox have dominated the process from the beginning: from 2003 to 2007 alone the population of Beitar Illit, whose construction was facilitated by the expropriation of 1,500 dunams of Naḥḥālīn farmland, rose 40%, while Modi'in Illit, built on the Palestinian village lands of Ni'lin, Kharbata, Saffa, Bil'in and Dir Qadis, increased by 55%.

The majority of Israeli West Bank agriculture arises from contracts with the World Zionist Organization that bypass direct contracts with the Israeli Land Regulating Commissioner, and many were given to use private Palestinian land. With the Regularization Law of 2017, Israel retroactively legalized the settler takeover of thousands of hectares of privately owned Palestinian land and some 4,500 homes which settlers had built without obtaining official permits. By that year, the fifth decade of occupation, Israel had managed to establish (2017) 237 settlements, housing roughly 580,000 settlers.

One technique used to established settlements was to set up a paramilitary encampment for army personnel to be used for agricultural and military training for soldiers. These were then slowly transformed into civilian settlements, often without official approval. This could be justified as legal because they were initially IDF bases without civilians. Another technique was to render land momentarily unusable. Gitit for example was established by closing off 5,000 dunams of the village lands of Aqraba and then spraying it with defoliants.

On occasion, creating settlements is hailed as a measure to punish Palestinians collectively, as a reaction to a Palestinian killing of a settler, or in response to the granting of non-member observer status to the Palestinian State by the United Nations, an announcement which generated plans for a further 3,000 settler homes in the West Bank. Economic motivations also drive settlement: if one sells one's 50-60 sq. m. apartment in Jerusalem, one can purchase with less than the sale proceeds an apartment three times larger in settlements like Ma’aleh Adumim.
One early metaphor likened the expansion of settlements to the baobab tree in The Little Prince, whose seeds take root and eventually cover the entire planet. By the early eighties, several authoritative observers, among them Eyal Benvenisti, already concluded that the settlement expansion was close to a point of no return from total annexation. The impression left of the landscape has been described as follows:

Israeli settlements form an upper-middle-class oasis of green grass, shopping malls, and swimming pools amidst open desert and enclaves of Palestinian refugee camps, villages, and towns with limited access to water.
American citizens lead the diaspora in moving into West Bank settlements, with 12% stating their first choice of residency is "Judea and Samaria". They now form the predominant block and number an estimated 60,000.

Legal status

Before proceeding with settlement, the government sought legal advice from their resident expert on international law, Theodor Meron. His top secret memorandum stated unequivocally that the prohibition on any such population transfer was categorical, and that "civilian settlement in the administered territories contravenes the explicit provisions of the Fourth Geneva Convention." indicating that the Prime Minister Levi Eshkol was therefore aware the promotion of settlements in the West Bank would be illegal. The International community has also since rejected Israel's unwillingness to accept the applicability of the Geneva Conventions to the territories it occupies, with most arguing all states are duty bound to observe them. Israel alone challenges this premise, arguing that the West Bank and Gaza are "disputed territories", and that the Conventions do not apply because these lands did not form part of another state's sovereign territory, and that the transfer of Jews into areas like the West Bank is not a government act but a voluntary movement by Israeli Jewish people, not acting under compulsion, a position contested by Yoram Dinstein.

The International Court of Justice also determined that Israeli settlements in the West Bank were established in breach of international law in their 2004 advisory opinion on the West Bank barrier. In 1980, Israel declined to sign the Vienna Convention on the Law of Treaties which obliges national laws to give way to international law when the two conflict, and regulates settlements in terms of its own laws, in lieu of any compulsion to observe its treaty commitments and by arguing that all the relevant UN bodies adjudicating the matter are "anti-Zionist and anti-Semitic".

Settler violence

Though settler vigilantism dates back to the late 1970s, when they were authorized to bear arms in self-defense – one ordinance exempted them from military service in Israel while drafting them into West Bank units and another gave them powers to demand Palestinians provide identification and even to arrest them – settler terrorism formally dates back at least to the Jewish Underground movement of the early 1980s, which began by targeting and severely maiming, through the deployment of car bombs, West Bank mayors such as Bassam Shakaa of Nablus, and Karim Khalaf of Ramallah. In the first 2 years of the First Intifada, settlers killed at least 34 Palestinians, 4 below the age of 16, with 11 killed by settler initiative at home or while guarding flocks; a further 6 probably died through settler actions, and 8 were killed in response to stone throwing at cars. Only two died as a result of clashes. In the 1980s attempts by one Jewish terrorist group led by Meir Kahane to set up settlements were blocked by other settlers, the heads of Gush Emunim, though Kahane's views would later motivate the Cave of the Patriarchs Massacre.

From 2009 such settler violence escalated rapidly, an uptick that coincided with a dramatic fall in Palestinian terror attacks. In 2009, 200 settler attacks took place, a figure which doubled to over 400 by 2011. Of the latter, nearly 300 consisted in attacks on Palestinian property, causing 100 Palestinian casualties, and the destruction of roughly 10,000 trees. Many of these are carried out as Price tag acts, which target innocent Palestinians and are designed to intimidate the local population. Yesh Din discovered that of 781 such incidents covered from 2005 to 2011, 90% of the Israeli investigations were closed without laying indictments, and many of the culprits were Hilltop Youth. In an analysis of 119 cases of settlers killing Palestinians, it emerged that only 13 were sent to gaol: 6 were convicted of murder, only one of whom was sentenced to life imprisonment, while of 7 convicted of manslaughter, 1 received a prison sentence of 7 and a half years for killing a child, and the rest got off with light sentences.

Writing in 2012, Daniel Byman and Natan Sachs judged that the pattern of settler violence was "undoubtedly working" and achieving its ends, by influencing the way Palestinians view Israelis, strengthening the hand of terrorists among them, and by seeding fears in the Israeli government that any pullout in exchange for peace will lead to conflict with settlers and a political disaster for the political parties involved.

State of asymmetric war
West Bank Palestinians have engaged in two uprisings that have led to an asymmetric set of wars of attrition, between the occupying power and the occupied people. This characterization has been further refined by classifying the conflict as structurally asymmetric, where the root cause of tension lies in the standoff between a colonizer and the colonized, and in which the large power imbalance in favour of the dominator leads to a resort to guerilla tactics or terrorism by the dominated.Much of what Palestinians defend as acts of "resistance" are, in Israeli usage, regarded as "terrorism". Making speeches calling on fellow Palestinians to resist the occupation is construed in Israeli law as tantamount to advocacy of terrorism. In the case of the parliamentarian Azmi Bishara, he was stripped of his immunity rights in the Knesset in order to pave the way for a criminal indictment on this charge.

International law does not address the issue regarding the rights of an occupied people to resist an occupation which flagrantly violates fundamental human rights. The United Nations General Assembly Resolution 1514 established that force may not be used to deny self-determination, and that recourse to force to resist colonial or alien domination is legitimate.

The two fundamental preconditions for containing conflict – clearly defined borders and rough power parity between the parties at war – are absent, with a pronounced economic and military disparity favouring Israel. The disparity extends, according to Nathan Thrall, to the numerous negotiations over a peace settlement. According to Aharon Klieman, even Israeli negotiating tactics with Palestinians follow the principles of warfare used by the IDF.

Armaments (Israel)
In terms of armaments, Israel is reputed to have "the strongest and best-equipped army of the Middle East." The arsenal at Israel's disposal to counteract major Palestinian uprisings ranges from F-16 fighters, Merkava tanks, Apache helicopters, Hellfire missiles, massive armoured D9 Caterpillar bulldozers. to the standard M-16 rifle and the use of snipers.

The Israeli techniques for daily dispersing protesting crowds differ according to the ethnicity of the protestors. With Jewish settlers by and large the methods are those policing approaches used in Western countries, and they are reported as not intervening when settlers go on the rampage against Palestinians. With Palestinians, contrariwise, military tactics are adopted, and observers such as B'Tselem claim lack of proportionality and recourse to firearms is characteristic. With the latter at demonstrations Israeli forces have drawn on rash gas, tear gas canisters (which have often produced fatalities); shooting into crowds with rubber-coated steel bullets, which can be lethal; high-velocity bullets; recourse to the use of live ammunition rounds; the deployment from 2008 of trucks dousing whole areas with putrid Skunk spray; stun grenades; water cannons; pepper spray; capsaisin projectiles; deployment of snatch squads and mista'arvim and sponge rounds. The use of rubber-coated metal bullets is allowed in the West Bank but forbidden from deployment against people within Israel. Also deployed on occasion since 2005 when they were used at Bil’in, are loud sound-wave generating devices, gravel-throwing machines; shock-inducing polystyrene and bismuth metal paintball pellets, and tasars. In the first Intifada, snipers targeted youths primarily to maim them, with dum dum shots to the right arm biceps crippling their use by stone-throwers for life.

Armaments (Palestinians)
The primary value developed by Palestinians to resist the occupation from 1967 has been ṣumūd, hanging on stubbornly, a steadfast perseverance in remaining on one's land, even if it turns into a prison, in the face of Jewish hitnahalut (settlement). The word itself was consistently repressed from Palestinian papers by Israeli censors in the early decades. Mubarak Awad, founder of the Palestinian Centre for the Study of Nonviolence, endeavoured to inculcate Gandhian principles of non-violence in the West Bank, and was subsequently expelled and sent into exile by Israel on the grounds he preached non-violence as a cover an armed struggle for liberation. The village of Bil'in, one of the first villages, along with Budrus and Abu Dis, to practice Gandhian methods of non-violent resistance, has in one decade (2005–2015) been subjected to incessant night raids, seen hundreds of its residents arrested, its leader Abdullah Abu Rahmeh put on trial 5 times and sentenced to imprisonment, and thousands of demonstrators injured.

The mainstay of Palestinian armed resistance techniques to the occupation during the First Intifada, which was generally non-lethal, consisted of throwing stones during clashes with at Israeli troops, or at military and settler vehicles bearing their distinctive yellow number plates, together with tire-burning, hurling Molotov cocktails and setting up roadblocks. The then Defense Minister Yitzhak Rabin's policy was that, "rioters must emerge with casualties or scars." The juxtaposition of this primitive method with Israeli power was striking, with children and youths throwing stones and deploying slingshots against a fully equipped and highly trained military power exerting overwhelming superiority.

Years later, a spiral in escalation led to the increased use of knifing and Palestinian suicide attacks corresponding to the expansion of deployment of warplanes, helicopters, and recourse to assassinations by Israel. In the Al-Aqsa Intifada, suicide bombers, among which youths figured prominently, were deployed and became a central feature from 2001 to 2005, of the second uprising. Aside from the PLO's Fatah, many armed militant factions, Marxist, Islamic or otherwise, became involved, such as the Tanzim, the al-Aqsa Martyrs' Brigades, Hamas, Islamic Jihad Movement in Palestine, the Popular Front for the Liberation of Palestine, the Democratic Front for the Liberation of Palestine, and Popular Resistance Committees. This flared up into a large-scale military confrontation when, according to Ma'ariv, 700,000 rounds of ammunition were fired at West Bank crowds protesting the shooting of Palestinians in and around the Haram al-Sharif, killing 118 Palestinians, of whom 33 were teenagers. From 2001 to 2007 Israel killed more Palestinians annually than it had over the first two decades of occupation, averaging 674 as opposed to the earlier 32 per year. Kill ratios between the first and second intifada differ markedly.  1 Israeli was killed for every 25 Palestinians in the first, whereas the figure for the first year of the second the ratio varied from 1 Israeli to 2.5/3 Palestinians. The earlier ratio of 25:1 was only reestablished by 2007.

The overall historic pattern of Palestinian violence in comparative terms, according to Nathan Thrall, appears to be far less participatory and deadly than other examples of local resistance to a foreign occupation. The four major outbreaks all began in civic demonstrations and strikes which, when violently repressed, led to a resort to violence.

Technologies of control
Ben Ehrenreich, citing Gudrun Krämer's description of the British military suppression of the 1936 Palestinian Revolt, states that, aside from caning, all of the extreme measures adopted by the Mandatory authorities recur as standard practices in the way Israel manages the occupied territories.
Scholars differ regarding how to classify the techniques of segregation and exclusion used to further Israeli control over the West Bank. For Jan Selby, there are five central planks to consolidate territorial colonization: (a) settlement construction; (b) land confiscation and engineering a bypass road network (c) drawing the local economy into dependence on Israel's larger one; (d) the creation of a dual legal system with different laws for Palestinians and Jewish settlers, with subsidies favouring the latter and (e) seeking local clients and patrons who would act according to Israel's bidding, and, in lieu of success in this regard, increased repression. Gershon Shafir has discerned a matrix of five technologies of Israeli domination over Palestinians (a) the permit system; (b) administrative detention; (c)deportation: (d) house demolitions, and (e) torture. Richard Falk adds political assassinations, extrajudicial punishments and the use of collective punishment to the list. According to Neve Gordon, Israel uses lawfare "to encode the field of human rights and in this way (has) help(ed) frame human rights work in Israel as a security threat."

Population transfer and deportations
Israel was one of the High Contracting Parties to the Fourth Geneva Convention dealing specifically with protection of civilians in a war zone, and, as a signatory, underwrote Article 49 which reads: Individual or mass forcible transfers, as well as deportations of protected persons from occupied territory to the territory of the Occupying Power or to that of any other country, occupied or not, are prohibited, regardless of their motive... The Occupying Power shall not deport or transfer parts of its own civilian population into the territory it occupies.
This final clause is absolute, allowing of no exceptions, and was ratified by Israel when it signed the Geneva Conventions on 6 July 1951. The sentence was written to prevent the repetition of the practice of colonization established by certain powers, by which Germany was to be understood, of transferring their population to conquered territories for political and racial reasons in WW2. Furthermore, Article 76 of that convention excludes deportation as a punitive measure in stating that
protected persons accused of offences shall be detained in the occupied country and, if convicted, they shall serve their sentences therein.
The principle is unambiguous – "an occupier cannot expel a single person, however much that person constitutes a security risk".

According to one estimate, between 1967 and 1978 some 1,151 individuals were deported by Israel, including two whole tribes, dispatched into exile en masse from the area of the Jordan Valley in December 1967 and May 1969. To provide legal warrant for these measures, which contravene the Fourth Geneva Convention, Israel applied law 112 going back to the British Mandatory government's Defence (Emergency) Regulations which predated the Geneva Convention by 4 years. These in turn went back to military emergency legislation devised to counteract the Palestinian war of opposition to British occupation and Jewish immigration in 1936-1939.
Fathers were most frequently affected in the early days: sundering families, the practice was arrest household heads at night in their homes and take them to a desert south of the Dead Sea where they were forced, at gunpoint or gunshot, to cross over into Jordan. To this day, any Palestinian Jerusalemite can have his or her residency revoked by Israeli law if Jerusalem has not constituted, in the view of the Israeli authorities, their "centre of life" for seven consecutive years, a revocation constituting a forced population transfer that has been applied to at least 14,595 Palestinians since 1967 (2016). The PLO, inspired by the precedent of the SS Exodus, once endeavoured to sail a "Ship of Return" into Haifa harbour with 135 Palestinians Israel had deported from the territories. Mossad assassinated with a car-bomb the three senior Fatah officials organizing the event in Limassol, and then sunk the ship in the port.

The forced transfer of Palestinians still takes place in the West Bank: in 2018 the Israeli Supreme Court gave the green light to expel the people of Khan al-Ahmar from their township to a rubbish dump outside Abu Dis. Israel arrested at a checkpoint in February 2017 Maen Abu Hafez, a 23-year-old Palestinian, since he had no ID, and detained him under a deportation order in a prison for aliens in Ramla, Israel. He had been raised since the age of 3 in the Jenin Refugee Camp. Israel seeks to deport him to Brazil, though he speaks no Portuguese, his mother is Uruguayan and his Palestinian father deserted the family to return to Brazil in 1997 and has not been heard from since.

Collective punishment
Israel's use of collective punishment measures, such as movement restrictions, shelling of residential areas, mass arrests, and the destruction of public health infrastructure. violates Articles 33 and 53 of the Fourth Geneva Convention. Article 33 reads in part:
No protected person may be punished for an offence he or she has not personally committed. Collective penalties and likewise all measures of intimidation or of terrorism are prohibited

Collective punishment of Palestinians also can be traced back to British mandatory techniques in suppressing the 1936-1939 revolt. and has been reintroduced and in effect since the early days of the occupation, and was denounced by Israel Shahak as early as 1974. Notoriety for the practice arose in 1988 when, in response to the killing of a suspected collaborator in the village, Israeli forces shut down Qabatiya, arrested 400 of the 7,000 inhabitants, bulldozed the homes of people suspected of involvement, cut all of its telephone lines, banned the importation of any form of food into the village or the export of stone from its quarries to Jordan, shutting off all contact with the outside world for almost 5 weeks (24 February-3 April). In 2016 Amnesty International stated that the various measures taken in the commercial and cultural heart of Hebron over 20 years of collective punishment have made life so difficult for Palestinians that thousands of businesses and residents have been forcibly displaced, enabling Jewish settlers to take over more properties.

House demolitions

House demolition is considered a form of collective punishment. According to the law of occupation, the destruction of property, save for reasons of absolute military necessity, is prohibited. The practice of demolishing Palestinian houses began within two days of the conquest of the area in the Old City of Jerusalem known as the Moroccan Quarter, adjacent to the Western Wall. From the outset of the occupation of the Palestinian territories down to 2015, according to an estimate by the ICAHD, it has been estimated that Israel has razed 48,488 Palestinian structures, with a concomitant displacement of hundreds of thousands of Palestinians.

Israel regards its practice as directed against houses built without Israeli permits or a form of deterrence of terrorism, since a militant is thereby forced to consider the effect of his actions on his family. Between September 2000 and the end of 2004, of the 4,100 homes the IDF razed in the territories, 628, housing 3,983 people were undertaken as punishment because a member of a family had been involved in the Al Aqsa insurgency. From 2006 until 31 August 2018, Israel demolished at least 1,360 Palestinian residential units in the West Bank (not including East Jerusalem), causing 6,115 people – including at least 3,094 minors – to lose their homes. 698 of these, homes to 2,948 Palestinians of whom 1,334 minors, were razed in the Jordan Valley (January 2006 – September 2017).

Even huts by shepherds, on which taxes have been duly paid, can be demolished.

Permit regime

From 1967, almost every aspect of ordinary everyday Palestinian life was subject to pervasive military regulations, calculated to number of 1,300 by 1996, from planting trees and importing books, to house extensions. Military order 101 denied West Bankers the right to purchase any form of printed matter – books, posters, photographs and even paintings – from abroad (including from Israel) unless prior authorization had been obtained from the military. In the first two decades Palestinians were required to apply for permits and licenses for an enormous number of things such as a driver's license, a telephone, trademark and birth registration, and a good conduct certificate to secure jobs in numerous professions. Obtaining such permits has been described as a via dolorosa. The precise criteria to be satisfied for obtaining permits have never been clarified. It has been likened to the pass system of Apartheid. Zygmunt Bauman's warnings of the debilitating effect bureaucracy may have on the human condition has been cited to throw light on the Orwellian or Kafkaesque trap of red tape that, it is argued, places a stranglehold on Palestinian autonomy. There are 42 types of permits, depending on the purpose of one's movements, required by Israeli authorities as of 2018.

Impact on education

The high priority traditionally accorded education in Palestinian society continued over the early occupation, with, by 1979, Palestinians making up an estimated 10% of all Arab university graduates. Internal evidence from leaked reports in the 1960s suggest that improved high education for Israeli Arabs was thought at the time to pose a potential a security threat. Israel signed the International Covenant on Economic, Social and Cultural Rights in 1966, ratified in 1991. After 1967, Israel asserted that the right to education did not apply to the West Bank, East Jerusalem and Gaza, territories it held under occupation, since they lay outside Israel's sovereign borders.

During the first Intifada at one point Israel imposed a 19-month closure on all schools in the West Bank, including kindergartens, suggesting to at least one observer that Israel was intentionally aiming to disrupt the cognitive development of Palestinian youths. In the first two years of the Al-Aqsa Intifada, 100 schools were fired on by the IDF, some were bombed and others occupied as military outposts. In 2017, according to one estimate, Israel had issued either demolition or "stop work" orders affecting 55 West Bank schools.

Night raids
According to Major General Tal Rousso, the IDF undertakes operations "all the time, every night, in all divisions." Israeli night raids are usually undertaken between 2 am and 4 am. The units, whose members are often masked and accompanied by dogs, arrive in full battle gear and secure entry by banging on doors or blowing them off their hinges. Surging blips in frequency may relate to rotation of new units into an area. Most occur in villages in close proximity to settlements. Such missions have several different purposes: to arrest suspects, conduct searches, map the internal structure of a dwelling, and photograph youths to improve recognition in future clashes. Laptops and cellphones are often seized, and, if returned, not infrequently damaged. Vandalism is commonplace, with looted objects given to needy soldiers or those on low pay, as in Operation Defensive Shield. Reports of stashes of money that go missing after a search are frequent. Many personal effects – photos of children or families, watches, medals, football trophies, books, Qur'ans, jewelry – are taken and stored away, and, according to one informant, intelligence officer trainees were allowed to take items of such Palestinian "memorabilia", called "booty," from storerooms. After international protests, in February 2014 a pilot scheme was begun to issue summonses instead of arresting children at night, and programmed to last until December 2015 The purpose of mapping raids is, reportedly, to work out how an area looks from Palestinian angles for future planning to enable an option for "straw widows" operations (mounting ambushes from inside those homes).

The practice by Israeli military units of raiding, making arrests in, and ransacking Palestinians homes deep in the night is a long-standing practice, persisting to the present day. In just three days over 21–23 January 2018, 41, 24 and 32 separate raids were made In 2006 Israel made 6,666 raids inside the occupied territories. In the first six months of 2007, 3,144 Israeli search/arrest raids were made in the West Bank the parents of 90% of minors arrested, blindfolded and handcuffed in night raids, were given no explanation for the abduction, nor information about where the child would be detained. In another study, 72.7% of children studied had witnessed night raids, the traumatic experience coming second after watching scenes of mutilated or wounded bodies on TV. An extrapolation from this figure would, according to the NGO WCLAC, suggest that from the time martial law was imposed in June 1967 up to 2015, over 65,000 night raids had been conducted by the Israeli military on Palestinian homes in the West Bank (not including East Jerusalem).

Arrests and administrative detention

An estimated 650,000 Palestinians were detained by Israel from 1967 to 2005, one in three of all Palestinians in the first two decades alone. The military court system, regarded as the institutional centerpiece of the occupation, treats Palestinians as "foreign civilians" and is presided over by Jewish Israeli judges drew on prior British Mandatory law, where its application to Jewish activists was vigorously protested by the yishuv representatives. Four provisions entail (a) long detention of suspects incommunicado (b) without access to a lawyer (c) coercive interrogation to obtain evidence and (d) the use of "secret evidence". Over this period, tens of thousands have been subject to administrative detention, whose rationale is to incarcerate suspects who, in conventional criminal law, might not be convictable. Taisir al-Arouri, a Bir Zeit University professor of mathematics, was arrested at night on 21 April 1974 and released on 18 January 1978, after suffering 45 months of imprisonment without trial or charges being laid, only after Amnesty International issued a public protest.

The practice was considered by one scholar in 1978 as "an aberration of criminal justice" of a provisory nature. In 2017 Amnesty International, noted that "hundreds of Palestinians, including children, civil society leaders and NGO workers were regularly under administrative detention", and regards some, such as Khalida Jarrar and Ahmad Qatamesh, as prisoners of conscience.

Torture

States are obliged under the Fourth Geneva Convention to prevent torture, including mental suffering. According to Lisa Hajjar (2005) and Dr. Rachel Stroumsa, the director of the Public Committee Against Torture in Israel, torture has been an abiding characteristic of Israeli methods of interrogation of Palestinians. Torture can be of two types, physical and psychological. Reports of torture emerged in the 1970s, and began to be documented in detail by the NGO Al-Haq in the mid 1980s. The 1987 the Landau Commission examined some abuses and concluded "moderate physical pressure" was acceptable. The practice was then banned by Israel's High Court, barring case-by-case authorizations by the Attorney-General.

The Hebrew army slang term tertur is associated with policies introduced by Rafael Eitan, who ordered army troops and border police to engage in repeated arrests and the humiliation of large numbers of the Palestinian population in the territories. This refers to practices such as the wholesale roundups that took place whenever West Bank Arabs staged nationalist demonstrations. Israeli border police have been witnessed forcing Arabs to sing the Israeli national anthem, slap each other's faces and crawl and bark like dogs. The police have also arrested thousands of Arabs each year on "security" charges, which have ranged from outright terrorism to simply reading blacklisted books.

Children

Documented incidents of Israeli forces targeting and killing Palestinian children date back to the earliest days of the conflict. Following the 1948 war, prior to Israel's formal occupation of the West Bank, border skirmishes between Israelis and Arabs were a regular occurrence with multiple cases involving Israeli soldiers shooting unarmed Palestinians, including children, dead. During the 1952 Beit Jala raid, 4 children ranging in age from 6 to 14 were killed by machine gun fire. During the First Intifada, Palestinian children regularly suffered serious, often fatal injuries. The First Intifada saw exceptionally high involvement by Palestinian teenagers, prompting Israel to declare stone throwing a felony under occupation law, a categorization that applied to children as well as adults and allowed for protracted incarceration of minors. Ill-treatment of Palestinian children in the Israeli military detention system appears to be widespread, systematic and institutionalized. According to a 2013 study by the United Nations International Children's Emergency Fund, covering 10 years of allegations of the mistreatment of children in Israel's military practices in the West Bank, though international law requires that all children in contact with judicial systems be treated with dignity and respect at all times, the evidence from multiple outside observers over a decade suggests Palestinian children under Israel military detention suffer cruel and degrading treatment. In law, the prohibition against such practices is "absolute and unconditional," and even security considerations or threats of war cannot override the rule.

Children constitute half of the Palestinian population, and though often construed as "mute victims or misguided puppets", they actively engage in the resistance, with some arguing that in doing so they forfeit their rights. According to James Graff, Palestinian children comprise a notable segment of Palestinians targeted, and can be included in categories from which they are normally exempted, and be singled out as a group to be subject to traumatizing violence, and targeted in random shootings, gassings and violence by soldiers and by settlers sponsored by the state.

According to the Swedish branch of Save the Children, between 23,600 and 29,900 children required medical treatment after suffering injuries from IDF beatings during the first two years of the First Intifada, a third of them aged 10 or under. Under Yitzhak Rabin's 19 January 1988 order to employ "might, power and beatings" and an interview in which he spoke of the need to "break their bones", beatings, which until then had usually been a hidden interrogation method, went public, until an outcry arose when journalists filmed the tactic, a scandal countered by issuing a ban on media entering the territories in the spring of 1988.

Minors (16 years old and under) adding up to 5% of the child population constituted 35-40% of the 130,000 Palestinians who suffered serious injuries from Israeli troops in this uprising. Of 15-year-olds and under requiring medical treatment, 35% were injured by Israeli gunfire, 50% by beatings, and 14.5% suffered from tear gassing. From 2009 to 2018 Israel Security squads shot dead 93 Palestinian minors in West Bank clashes. In the period of the Al-Aqsa uprising, the ratios of those killed indicate that roughly 20- 25% were children on both sides, with the difference that Israeli fatalities were from incidents of body-bombing in which they were not the primary targets, whereas a substantial proportion of Palestinian children were killed by Israeli sniper gun-fire directed individually, according to Frank Afflitto. From September 2000-to December 2003, 109 children were killed by "one-shot wonders" in the head, 4 in the neck, and 56 by exclusive heart-chest shots. A further 90 were killed with two or three gunshot wounds. Overall, in the 3.25 years after the second uprising 427 children were shot dead by IDF forces and settlers.

Fragmentation

Background
In 1920 Israel Zangwill argued that creating a state free of Jews would require a South African type of "racial redistribution". In 1931 Arnold Toynbee prophesied that, given the nature of the Zionist project to secure land only for Jewish use to the exclusion of Palestinian labour, that the British mandatory government would be forced eventually to compensate the process by legislation that would create a land reservation for the exclusive use of Palestinians. He drew a parallel with the situation in South Africa under the Natives Land Act, 1913 which established the principle of segregation. These segregated territorial reserves were the forerunners of the bantustans, a word that gained currency only much later in the 1940s. After the foundation of Israel in 1948, its first president Chaim Weizmann and South African Prime Minister Jan Smuts supported each other's view on the racial basis of their respective states and their rights over indigenous lands.

Planning for fragmentation
The official "Master Plan for the Development of Samaria and Judea to the year 2010" (1983) foresaw the creation of a belt of concentrated Jewish settlements linked to each other and Israel beyond the Green line while disrupting the same links joining Palestinian towns and villages along the north–south highway, impeding any parallel ribbon development for Arabs and leaving the West Bankers scattered, unable to build up larger metropolitan infrastructure, and out of sight of the Israeli settlements. The result has been called a process of "enclavization," ghettoization, typified most visibly by the enclosure of Qalqilya in a concrete wall, or what Ariel Sharon called the Bantustan model, an allusion to the apartheid system, and one which many argue, makes Israel's occupational policies not dissimilar, despite different origins, from the South African model. In particular it bears comparison to the policies applied in South Africa to the Transkei, a policy that may have a broader geopolitical reach, if the Yinon Plan is to be taken as an indication of Israeli policy. The World Bank argued in 2009 that creating economic islands in the West Bank and Gaza is a developmental dead-end that would only imperil the construction of an economically unified and viable Palestinian state.

One observed function of the Separation Barrier is to seize large swathes of land thought important for future settlement projects, notoriously in the case of the area of Susya absorbing land worked by Bedouin herders with proven Ottoman title to the terrain. The construction, significantly inspired by the ideas of Arnon Soffer to "preserve Israel as an Island of Westernization in a Crazy Region", had as its public rationale the idea of defending Israel against terroristic attacks, but was designed at the same time to incorporate a large swathe of West Bank Territory, much of it private Palestinian land: 73% of the area marked for inclusion into Israel was arable, fertile, and rich in water, formerly constituting the "breadbasket of Palestine".

Had the barrier been constructed along the Green Line with the same purpose it would have run 313 kilometres, instead of 790 kilometres, and have cost far less than the $3.587 billion the extended wall is estimated to cost (2009). The disparity arises from the government's decision to rope in dozens of settlements west of the barrier. That it remains unfinished is said to be due to pressure from settler lobbies opposed to a completion that would restrict the further expansion of settlements or cut them off from Israel, as with Gush Etzion. There are only 12 gates through the 168 kilometres of the wall surrounding East Jerusalem, of which in theory four allow access to West Bankers who manage to obtain a permit. A whole generation of West Bankers have never seen the city, or the Haram al Sharif, a denial of international law stipulating the right of access to sites of worship.

Legal system

The Israeli-Palestinian conflict is characterized by a legal asymmetry, which embodies a fragmented jurisdiction throughout the West Bank, where ethnicity determines what legal system one will be tried under. According to Michael Sfard and others, the intricate military system of laws imposed on Palestinians has enabled rather than limited violence.
Down to 1967, people in the West Bank lived under one unified system of laws applied by a single judicial system. State law (qanun) is a relatively alien concept in Palestinian culture, where a combination of the Shari'a and customary law (urf) constitutes the normal frame of reference for relations within the basic social unity of the family clan (hamula. Settlers are subject to Israeli civil law, Palestinians to the occupying arm's military law. Overall the Israeli system has been described as one where "Law, far from limiting the power of the state, is merely another way of exercising it." A Jewish settler can be detained up to 15 days, a Palestinian can be detained without charges being laid for 160 days.

According to the legal framework of international law, a local population under occupation should continue to be bound by its own penal laws and tried in its own courts. However, under security provisions, local laws can be suspended by the occupying power and replaced with military orders enforced by military courts. In 1988, Israel amended its Security Code in such a way that international law could no longer be invoked before the military judges in their tribunals. The High Court upheld only one challenge to the more than 1,000 arbitrary military orders that had been imposed from 1967 down to 1990 and that are legally binding in the occupied territories. Israeli businesses in the West Bank employing Palestinian labour drew up employment laws according to Jordanian law. This was ruled in 2007 by the Israeli Supreme Court to be discriminatory, and that Israeli law must apply in this area, but as of 2016, according to Human Rights Watch, the ruling has yet to be implemented, and the government states that it cannot enforce compliance.

Freedom of movement

The Universal Declaration of Human Rights establishes freedom of movement as a fundamental human right.

It has been said that for "Jewish settlers, roads connect; for Palestinians, they separate." Between 1994 and 1997, the Israeli Defense Forces (IDF) built 180 miles of bypass roads in the territories, on appropriated land because they ran close to Palestinian villages. The given aim was said to be to afford protection to settlers from Palestinian sniping, bombing, and drive-by shootings. Permanent and flying checkpoints (some 327 a month in 2017), barriers and restrictive networks restructure the West Bank into "land cells", freezing the flow of normal everyday Palestinian lives. TAU emeritus professor Elisha Efrat argues they form an apartheid network of "octopus arms which hold a grip on Palestinian population centres." A large number of embankments, concrete slabs, manned checkpoints, mounds, trenches, iron gates, fences, and walls impede movement on primary and secondary roads. The result was to cantonize and fragment Palestinian townships, and cause endless obstacles to Palestinians going to work, schools, markets and relatives. Women have died or had miscarriages while waiting for permission at a checkpoint to go to hospital. The World Bank that the impact of restrictions on movement for workers cost roughly US$229 million per annum (2007) while additional costs from the circuitous routes people must drive totaled US$185 million in 2013. In one village, Kafr Qaddum, soldiers from the Nahal Brigade planted explosive devices on a tract of land where demonstrators gather, as a "deterrence" measure: they were removed when a 7-year-old child was injured playing with one.

In February 2022, Israel issued a 97 page ordinance for implementation by 5 July. The document relaces a former 4 page guideline regulating entry and exiting Palestinian areas. Strict limits are imposed on foreigners, students, businessmen, academics, and, in general, Palestinians with dual nationality visiting families there. The tightening of movements is expected to have major negative repercussions on the local Palestinian economy.

Village closures

The closure (Hebrew seger, Arabic ighlaq) policy operates on the basis of a pass system developed in 1991, and is divided into two types: a general closure restriction the movement of goods and people, except when a permit is given, from and to Israel and the West Bank and Gaza, developed in response to a series of stabbings in the former 1993, and the implementation of total closure over both areas. Aside from general closures, total closures were imposed for over 300 days from September 1993 after the Declaration of Principles of the Oslo I Accord and late June 1996. The strictest total closure was put in place in the spring of 1996 in the wake of a series of the suicide bombings executed by the Gaza-Strip based organization of Hamas in retaliation for the assassination of Yahya Ayyash, when the Israeli government imposed a total 2-week long ban on any movement by over 2 million Palestinians between 465 West Bank towns and villages, a measure repeated after the deadly clashes arising from the archaeological excavations under the Western Wall of the Haram al Sharif/Temple Mount.

The IDF erected iron gates at the entrances to the overwhelming majority of Palestinian villages, allowing the army to shut them down at will, in minutes. Notable examples of villages that have undergone long term isolation, with residents suffering extreme restrictions on movement, are Nuaman, which was absorbed into the Jerusalem municipality while having its inhabitants classified as West Bankers, and Kafr Qaddum which has had a permanent roadblock at its entrance for 14 years, from 2003, the same time the settlement of Kedumim was established, and since 2011 its villagers have been protesting the roadblock, which requires them to travel a distance six times greater than the usual route to access Nablus.

Towards the end of the Gulf War in Kuwait, Israel again imposed a curfew on the West Bank (and Gaza) lasting seven weeks, causing devastating economic setbacks, with thousands of Palestinians fired from their jobs in Israel. Nablus was subject to total curfews for 200 days in two years (2002–2004). During house raids, windows and doors were smashed, food stocks mashed up into an indistinct mush; grain stores, TVs, solar panels, water tanks and radios destroyed or impounded.

It is routine for the Israeli authorities to impose a comprehensive closure over the West Bank during Jewish holidays like Yom Kippur, Pesach, Sukkot and Rosh Hashanah, with an exception made for Jewish industrial areas in the territory. The reason given is to prevent terror attacks, and also to enable security personnel at checkpoints time off to enjoy these holidays. Such closures can at times last 11 days.

Marriage difficulties

Coming to terms with the problem of the Palestinian right of return while negotiating for UN recognition in 1948, Israel came up with a family reunification programme, and was granted membership on the understanding that it would comply with international law in this regard. The very word "return" (awda) was censored from being used in Palestinian newspapers as implying an existential threat to Israel. In practice, Israel evaluates proposed family reunifications in terms of a perceived demographic or security threat. They were frozen in 2002. Families composed of a Jerusalemite spouse and a Palestinian from the West Bank (or Gaza) face enormous legal difficulties in attempts to live together, with most applications, subject to an intricate, on average decade-long, four-stage processing, rejected. Women with "foreign husbands" (those lacking a Palestinian identity card), are reportedly almost never allowed to rejoin their spouse. The 2003 Citizenship and Entry into Israel Law (Temporary Provision), or CEIL, subsequently renewed in 2016 imposed a ban on family unification between Israeli citizens or "permanent residents" and their spouses who are originally of the West Bank or Gaza. Such a provision does not apply, however, to Israeli settlers in the West Bank or (until 2005) Gaza. In such instances, the prohibition is explained in terms of "security concerns".

A Jerusalemite Palestinian who joins their spouse in the West Bank and thereby fails to maintain seven years of consecutive residence in East Jerusalem can have their residency right revoked. According to B'Tselem, any of the over 2,000 Palestinians registered as absentee owners of property in the West Bank have been denied permission to re-enter for purposes like family reunifications because their return would compel the Israeli authorities to return their property, on which settlements have been established, to their original Palestinian owners.

Targeted assassinations

Targeted assassinations are acts of lethal selective violence undertaken against specific people identified as threats. Rumours emerged in the press around September 1989 that Israel had drawn up a wanted list, several of whom were subsequently killed, and it was speculated that the time Israel might be operating "death squads". Israel first publicly acknowledged its use of the tactic against Hussein Abayat at Beit Sahour near Bethlehem in November 2000. In its decision regarding the practice, the Israeli Supreme Court in 2006 refrained from either endorsing or banning the tactic, but set forth four conditions – precaution, military necessity, follow-up investigation and proportionality- and stipulated that the legality must be adjudicated on a case-by-case analysis of the circumstances. Nils Melzer found the judgement to be a step forward but flawed in several key regards, particularly for failing to provide guidelines to determine when the practice would be permissible. According to one former official, cited by Daniel Byman, on average Israel spends on average 10 hours planning a targeted killing operation and ten seconds on whether to proceed with the assassination or not.

Of the 8,746 violent Palestinian deaths registered from 1987 to 2008, 836 were executed following the identification of individuals based on information gathered from collaborators. According to B'Tselem, an Israeli human rights organization, for the period between 2000 and the end of 2005, 114 civilians died as the result of collateral damage as Israeli security forces successfully targeted 203 Palestinian militants. The figures from 9 November 2000 to 1 June 2007 indicate that Israeli assassinations killed 362 people, 237 being directly targeted and 149 bystanders collaterally. One intelligence officer recounting the atmosphere in the operations room where assassinations were programmed and then witnessed on video, stated that worries about "collateral damage" never dampened the cheers greeting a successful targeting mission.

Surveillance

Israel, in its capillary monitoring of Palestinians has been called a Surveillance state par excellence. The entire Palestinian population is kept under surveillance, regardless of intelligence concerns, using smartphones and closed-circuit cameras, some capable of seeing into homes, whose photos are then fed into the IDF's "Blue Wolf" tracking system, endowed with facial recognition technology. This is a pared down version of Wolf Pack, a computer data base containing "profiles of virtually every Palestinian in the West Bank, including photographs of individuals, their family histories, education and a security rating for each person." The deployment of such systems is banned in Israel.  IDF soldiers on West Bank checkpoint duty are not allowed to end their shifts until they have filled their quota of 50 photos of Palestinians passing the checkpoint, and details concerning them. Settlers have a parallel smartphone app, White Wolf, for scanning Palestinians. Military drones and balloons, and the invasive Pegasus spyware for penetrating smartphones, also form part of the West Bank surveillance system.

Among many Israeli critics of the occupation, the activist Jeff Halper and the philosopher Avishai Margalit express concerns at the paralysing effect on Palestinians of intricate surveillance systems, of a "matrix of control" underlying the occupation. Soon after hostilities ceased, Israel began to count all items in households from televisions to refrigerators, stoves down to heads of livestock, orchards and tractors. Letters were checked and their addresses registered, and inventories were drawn up of workshops producing furniture, soap, textiles, sweets and even eating habits. While many innovations were introduced to improve workers' productivity, they can also be seen as control mechanisms. Forward military planners in Israel foresee the day when Israel will withdraw from parts of the West Bank: this will not end the Occupation, for thereafter they envisage an "invisible occupation"/"airborne occupation" or "occupation in disappearance" régime, with a continued capacity to control the physically evacuated territory with surveillance and strikes.

One former Israeli intelligence officer involved in Unit 8200 likened the surveillance system to that in the German film The Lives of Others, with the difference, in his view, that the Israeli monitoring was more efficient. While the Israeli public thinks, he stated, that this surveillance is focused on combating terrorism, in practice a significant amount of intelligence gathering targets innocent people with no record for militancy. No Palestinian was, he claimed, exempt from non-stop monitoring. Any information enabling "extortion" or blackmail, such as evidence of marital infidelity, health problems requiring treatment in Israel or sexual orientation is regarded as relevant. Israeli surveillance and strike presence over Palestinian areas is constant and intense, with former Shin Bet head Avi Dichter noting, "When a Palestinian child draws a picture of the sky, he doesn't draw it without a helicopter."

Censorship

In the West Bank both the British Mandatory "Defense Emergency Regulations of 1945, No. 88" – stipulating that "every article, picture, advertisement, decree and death notice must be submitted to military censors", – and "Israeli Military Order No. IOI (1967)", amended by "Order No. 718 (1977)" and "No. 938 (1981)" concerning "the prohibition of incitement and adverse propaganda" formed the basis for censoring West Bank publications, poetry and literary productions. The civil and military censorship bureaus could overturn each other's decisions, making publishing permits increasingly difficult. No clear guidelines however exist, so even works translated from the Hebrew press, or theatrical productions permitted in Israel, such as Hamlet, could be censored. Criticism of settlements was disallowed, as were sentiments of national pride. Obituaries mourning the dead, or expressing pride in the fallen ould be challenged. Even mentioning the word "Palestine" was forbidden. Under Israeli Military Order 101, Palestinians under military law were prohibited from demonstrating and publishing anything relating to a "political matter."

Newspapers could lose their licenses, without any reason given, on the basis of 1945 Emergency Regulation (Article 92/2). Travel permits to enable notable Palestinians like Elias Freij, Major of Bethlehem, to be interviewed abroad could be denied.
Graffiti (shi'arati) protesting the occupation were prohibited unless approved by the military, and owners of walls were made responsible and fined for the graffiti, so the practice had to be banned by Palestinians since it became a large source of revenue for Israel. Recently, surveillance of the internet, using software to ostensibly identify in social media posts potential threats led to the arrest of 800 Palestinians both by Israeli units and PA security forces, with 400 detained as "lone wolf terrorists" for what they wrote, though none had carried out attacks and, according to security expert, Ronen Bergman, no algorithm could identify lone-wolf attackers.

Coercive collaboration
One of the first things Israel captured on conquering the West Bank were the archives of the Jordanian Security Police, whose information allowed them to turn informers in the territory for that service into informers for Israel. Collaborators (asafir), broken in interrogation, and then planted in cells to persuade other prisoners to confess, began to be recruited in 1979. The number of collaborators with Israel before the Oslo Accords was estimated at around 30,000. According to Haaretz, Shin Bet has used a number of "dirty" techniques to enlist Palestinians on its payroll as informers. These methods include exploiting people who have been identified as suffering from personal and economic hardships, people requesting family reunification, or a permit for medical treatment in Israel.

Taxation

In interrnational law no occupying power has the right to impose taxes in addition to those existing before the occupation Under Military Order 31 of 27 June 1967. Israel took over the Jordanian taxation system, with a notable change: Israelis moving into settlements were exempt, being taxed under Israeli law, while by 1988, the high income tax rate of 55% for people with incomes in the 8,000 dinar bracket was squeezed so that it applied to those earning 5,231 JD. In Israel the 48% tax bracket applied to those who earned almost twice that amount.

In 1988 the affluent entrepreneurial Christian town of Beit Sahour, which had several hundred mainly family-run businesses, organized a tax boycott on the grounds they saw no benefits flow back from their taxes,  basing their boycott on the principle of the American colonial revolt against their British masters, namely No taxation without representation. They refused to pay VAT and/or income taxes. 350 households of 1,000 were targeted and their bank accounts were frozen, while 500 more had their bank account confiscated or debited.
Israel reacted with collective punishment, placing the town under a 42-day curfew. Residences were raided every day and business machinery, any equipment for commercial purposes, refrigerators, jewelry, money, household furniture and at times memorabilia, were confiscated. To shield soldiers from stone-throwing, cars were stopped and placed round the houses, while people were mustered to form human shields. The value of the goods confiscated bore no relation to the taxes being imposed, and were auctioned off in Israel at an estimated 20% of their replacement value. The effect was to virtually wipe out Beit Sahour's productive base.

Agriculture

The pastoral economy was a fundamental wing of the Palestinian economy. In certain areas, such as the South Hebron Hills, Palestinian bedouin shepherds have their grazing lands disseminated with poison pellets that kill off their flocks, and require minute gleaning and disposal to restore the land to health. In Area C, nearly 500,000 dunams of arable land exist, Palestinian access to which is severely restricted while 137,000 are cultivated or occupied by Israeli settlements. Were the 326,400 dunams theoretically open to Palestinian use made available, the World Bank calculates, it would add $US 1,068 billion to Palestinian productive capacities. Another 1,000,000 dunams could be exploited for grazing or forestry, were Israel to lift its restrictions. The World Bank estimates that were Palestinian agriculture given access to better water resources, they would benefit by a boost in agricultural output of around $1 billion per annum.

After 1967, restrictions were placed on the types of fruit tree and vegetables that could be planted, and even the importation of tractors required an Israeli permit. Just after the occupation, a trial study carried out on Deir Dibwan's land, which is rich in underground water, concluded that it showed great promise as one of the best sites in the West Bank for growing oranges and bananas. An Israeli drilling permit could not be obtained, leading most of those involved in the project to emigrate to the U.S. Israel's control of land, water, trade and markets, and its specification and rigorous restrictions on what could be grown, is held responsible for the decline of agriculture as a share of West Bank GDP, and the drop of agricultural labourers in the work market from 46% to 27%, so that from 1993 to 1995 output declined by 40.12%. In the years directly preceding the Al Aqsa uprising (1998–1999) the IDF and settlers uprooted 21,705 trees throughout the West Bank and Gaza Strip. From 2000 to 2009, ARIJ estimated that 1,628,126 fruit trees in the West Bank and Gaza were destroyed or uprooted by Israel.

Destruction of agricultural goods was considerable during the second intifada. In the five months following its outbreak, 57,928 olive trees, 49,370 citrus trees, 22,270 stone-fruit trees, 11,514 date palms, 12,000 banana trees and 30,282 grapevines were uprooted. Olive oil production dropped 80% that year as a result. In the 15-month period from the outbreak, down to December 2001, the total damage was calculated ast 155,343 olive trees, 150,356 citrus trees, 54, 223 almond trees, 12,505 date palm trees, 39,227 grape vines, 18,400 banana trees, and 49,851 other varieties of tree. From September 2000 to December 2002, Israeli forces destroyed 14,196 forest trees. In the first two years, taking in the damage wrought by Israel in both the West Bank and the Gaza Strip, according to Cheryl Rubenberg, 667,000 trees were eradicated and 3,669,000 square metres of agricultural land destroyed. According to Palestinian authorities, the restrictive allocation of water to Palestinian agriculture has remained constant, at 84 million cubic metres per annum, since 1967. The Oslo Accords foresaw a supplementary 70–80 million cubic metres being supplied, but in two decades only about half of this additional supply had been provided.

The olive tree, aside from its economic function, is a symbol of Palestinian nationhood, of their quest for independence, much as the pine introduced by Zionist arboriculture. 15% of the territories – 45% of its arable land – is covered by olive groves, and is both a key resource, and its bimonthly autumnal harvesting a period of deep socioeconomic importance for families in most villages in the West Bank, for whom it provides roughly 40% (2009) of West Bank agricultural output. It has mopped up unemployment caused by job loss in Israel after the outbreak of the Second Intifada and  the olive is known colloquially  as the shajara el-fakir (pauper's tree), and regarded as holy (shajara mubaraka). Their uprooting by state agencies or settlers is an everyday occurrence in the West Bank.

Israeli officials see olive grove cultivation as "one of the best ownership techniques around". One Israeli official likened Palestinian olive trees to Palestinian children. They look naïve but several years down the track they turn into ticking bombs. The centrality of such olive groves for Palestinians is, according to Michael Sfard, viewed in the Zionist narrative as emblematic of "Arab laziness", since it grows alone and can be shaken down once a year to yield its wealth. In one analysis in 2006 it emerged that only 4% of complaints against settler trespass and destruction of Palestinian olive trees ever led to prosecution.

Following an Ottoman practice of uprooting olive trees to punish tax evasion, Israel began destroying groves, but with the expressed purpose of increasing security for settlements, and visibility for its internal West Bank road system servicing the colonial infrastructure. Construction of the Separation Barrier, erected predominantly on West Bank land, led to the uprooting of tens of thousands of olive trees. In just one village, Qafeen, the wall's route led to the uprooting of 12,000 trees of this variety, while alienating the inhabitants from their groves with a further 100,000 trees left on the Israeli side in a seam-zone, which they may access only once a year. Aside from state practices, settlers have waged what one scholar terms "tree warfare" consisting in the stealing, uprooting, chopping or burning of native Palestinian olive groves, often as part of price tag operations.
Of the 708,000 dunums of irrigable land in the West Bank only 247,000 dunums under aggregate irrigation, and it has been calculated (2009) the gross margin Palestinians forego touches close to $480 million per annum, roughly about 10% of GDP. The collateral effect of loss for potential employment runs close to (upper estimate) 10,000 jobs. The World Bank has observed that only 35 per cent of irrigable Palestinian land is actually irrigated, which costs the economy 110,000 jobs and 10 per cent of GDP.

Water

In the wake of 1967, Israel abrogated Palestinian water rights in the West Bank, and with Military Order 92 of August of that year invested all power over water management to the military authority, Military order 158 of November of that year required Palestinians to obtain a permit from the military authorities before developing any new water installation. As of 1996, no Palestinian had received a permit to drill a well since that date, by which time Israel drew a third of its fresh water and 50% of its drinking water, from the West Bank. According to Human Rights Watch Israel's confiscation of water violates the Hague Regulations of 1907, which prohibit an occupying power from expropriating the resources of occupied territory for its own benefit.

Palestinians have complained that their economy and agriculture are badly affected by the depletion of village waters in favour of supplying settlements. Israel placed restrictive policies on West Bank users. Differentials in costs of supply to Palestinians and settlements, which consumed 8 to 10 times what Palestinians were allowed, was blatant: settlements paid 0.5 New Israeli shekels (NIS), while Palestinian villages paid 1.8 NIS, per m3, with the former supplied daily, while delivery to the latter was limited to one or two days a week. "Blatant discrimination" exists in water pricing, allocation and delivery systems. Water consumption by Israeli settlers in the Territories is roughly eight to ten times that of Palestinians. Water is sold to Israeli settlements for 0.5 New Israeli shekels (NIS) per m3, while it was sold to Palestinian villages for 1.8 NIS per m3.

According to John Cooley, West Bank Palestinian farmers' wells were a key element behind Israel's post-1967 strategy to keep the area and in order to protect "Jewish water supplies" from what was considered "encroachment"

By 2013, though some villages had only 15 litres per person, it was estimated West Bank Palestinians were supplied an average per capita 70 litres per day, as opposed to the 280–300 litres per person for Jewish settlers. Sometimes the contrast is starker: Al-Hadidiya's 20 litres per person versus the 431 litres per day consumed on the neighbouring Jewish moshav settlement of Ro'i, which draws 431 litres per person per day from a well it drilled on Al-Hadidiya land.

Israeli settlements have also pursued a practice of taking over for their own uses numerous springs belonging to Palestinian villages, appropriating them to create adjoining parks suitable to tourism. Palestinians are denied access.

Waste zone

Israel ratified the international Basel Convention treaty on Israel on 14 December 1994, according to which, any transfer of waste must be performed with an awareness of the dangers posed to the disempowered occupied people. It forbids the creation among them of "environmental sacrifice zones." Israel, it is argued, uses the West Bank as a "sacrifice" zone for placing 15 waste treatment plants, which are there under less stringent rules that those required in Israel because a different legal system has been organized regarding hazardous materials that can be noxious to local people and the environment. The military authorities do not render public the details of these operations. These materials consist of such things as sewage sludge, infectious medical waste, used oils, solvents, metals, electronic waste and batteries.

Within Israel strict environment laws apply. Of 121 settlements studied in 2007, 81 had wastewater facilities, many subject to breakdown, with sewage flowing into streams affecting Palestinian villages nearby. Few pollution indictments result in action. Israel built 4 plants for Palestinian waste in the 1970s: only one was functioning (2007), and Israeli budgetary problems were cited for the lack of adequate infrastructure that left most Palestinian sewage untreated. The landfill near Al-Jiftlik in the Jericho Governorate, built on absentee Palestinian property without planning or an environment impact analysis, is for the exclusive use of waste, 1,000 tons per day, produced by Israeli settlements and cities within Israel. Palestinians are restricted to 3 landfills, and permits for more have been denied unless the sites can be used to dump settlement garbage. Even if a permit is given without this agreement, settler waste under military escort is still dumped there.

Loss of cultural property
 
The Israeli Antiquities Law of 1978 foresaw expropriations of any site necessary for preservation, excavation or research. The military administration can confiscate Palestinian land on or near such sites, deny their owners' building permits while at times, such areas are open to Israeli settlement. Under the Hague Convention of 1954 an occupying power may not remove material from the occupied country. In 2019 the Israeli High Court ruled that Israeli archaeological work in the West Bank may be kept off the public record. In 2019 alone, Israel order 119 demolition orders and warnings to desist from "destroying antiquities" in the West Bank, a rise of 162% over preceding years. Regavim's Shomrim Al Hanetzach ("guarding eternity") lobbies for such orders against what they call a "quiet Isis", though many affected families and villagers are unaware of any archaeological material on their land, and these zones net in areas far larger than the actual known archaeological remains at their centre.

Albert Glock, among others, argued that the thrust of archaeology has been to interpret the Palestinian past in Christian and Jewish Zionist terms, in the latter instance, providing a charter for the occupation, to the detriment of the Palestinian cultural heritage. Many sites with dual cultural value have been wrested from Palestinian control, such as the Herodium, Joseph's Tomb in Nablus, the Cave of the Patriarchs in Hebron, Rachel's Tomb the Tomb of Jesse and Ruth in Tel Rumeida, Hebron and at Qumran near the Palestinian villager of Shuqba is a garbage dump for settlement waste. Many Palestinian heritage sites within the West Bank have been added to the Jewish heritage list. Aside from the destruction of villages, in Jerusalem and elsewhere, significant losses were incurred by the expropriation of libraries with extensive historical resources regarding Palestine's Arabic past.

Tourism
The West Bank is a key attraction for pilgrims and tourists and has a rich heritage of deep significance for members of the Abrahamic religions. After 1967 the loss of East Jerusalem cut off potential gains to the West Bank economy from tourism. From 92 to 94 cents in every dollar of the tourist trade goes to Israel, which exercises a virtual monopoly. Israel controls all access points to the major tourist attractions in East Jerusalem, Bethlehem and Jericho, and Palestinian hotels in most West Bank areas remain half-empty.

Israeli obstacles make Palestinian recreational access to, or development of tourist infrastructure around, the Dead Sea difficult. The World Bank estimates that $126 million annually and 2,900 jobs would accrue to the local economy if Palestinians were allowed to operate on similar terms available to Israel entrepreneurs. Palestinians have been blocked at checkpoints from beaches there putatively because their presence would harm Israeli tourist businesses.

Resource extraction
According to the Hague Conventions (Article 55 an occupying power may reap some value from the resources of the country occupied but not deplete its assets: the usufruct must benefit the people under occupation. The Oslo Accords agreed to the transfer of mining rights to the Palestinian Authority.

Israel has given concessions for 11 settlement quarries to operate. The World Bank estimates that 275 quarries could be opened in Area C, and that Israeli restrictions cost the Palestinian economy US$241 million per year. Palestinians are also denied permits to process Dead Sea minerals, such as bromine, about 75% of world production of which comes from this area, while Israeli firms such as Ahava do so and export to the EU. The latter restrictions are estimated to cost the Palestinian economy $642 million.

Integration

East Jerusalem 
Arab residents of East Jerusalem are increasingly becoming integrated into Israeli society, in terms of education, citizenship, national service and in other aspects. Trends among East Jerusalem residents have shown: increasing numbers of applications for an Israeli ID card; more high school students taking the Israeli matriculation exams; greater numbers enrolling in Israeli academic institutions; a decline in the birthrate; more requests for building permits; a rising number of East Jerusalem youth volunteering for national service; a higher level of satisfaction according to polls of residents and increased Israeli health services. According to David Pollock, a senior fellow at The Washington Institute for Near East Policy, in the hypothesis that a final agreement was reached between Israel and the Palestinians with the establishment of a two-state solution, 48% of East Jerusalem Arabs would prefer being citizens of Israel, while 42% of them would prefer the State of Palestine and 9% would prefer Jordanian citizenship.

Economic and social benefits and costs of the occupation
Many Israeli businesses operate in the West Bank, often run by settlers who enjoy the benefits of government subsidies, low rents, favourable tax rates and access to cheap Palestinian labour. Human Rights Watch claims that the "physical imprint", with 20 Israeli industrial zones covering by 2016 some 1,365 hectares, of such commercial operations, agricultural and otherwise, is more extensive than that of the settlements themselves. The restrictions on Palestinian enterprise in Area C cause unemployment which is then mopped up by industrial parks that can draw on a pool of people without job prospects if not in settlements. Some Palestinian workers at the Barkan Industrial Park have complained anonymously that they were paid less than the minimum Israeli wage per hour ($5.75), with payments ranging from $1.50 to 2-4 dollars, with shifts of up to 12 hours, no vacations, sick days, pay slips or social benefits. Many such businesses export abroad, making the world complicit in the settlement project.

Israeli policy aimed to impede any form of Palestinian competition with Israeli economic interests. The approach was set forth by Israel's then Defense Minister Yitzhak Rabin in 1986, who stated:
"there will be no development initiated by the Israeli Government, and no permits will be given for expanding agriculture or industry, which may compete with the State of Israel".

The World Bank estimated that the annual economic costs to the Palestinian economy of the Israeli occupation of Area C alone in 2015 was 23% of GNP in direct costs, and 12% in indirect costs, totally 35% which, together with fiscal loss of revenue at 800 million dollars, totals an estimated 5.2 billion dollars. Fiscally, one estimate places the "leakage" of Palestinian revenue back to the Israeli treasury at 17% of total Palestinian public revenue, 3.6% of GNP. A 2015 estimate put annual Israeli government expenditure on settlements at $US1.1 billion, though this is an inference given that the government does not report its settlement outlays. By 1982 subsidized Israeli agricultural productions and unhampered flow of Israeli manufactures hindered the growth of manufacturing industries in the Palestinian territories. High tariffs imposed by Israel on imports from countries outside the area of Israel meant Palestinian consumers had a choice of paying high prices for imported goods from foreign countries, or purchasing them from high-cost Israeli suppliers. Palestinian goods exporting to Israel were hit by tariffs, which down to 1991 earned Israel annually $1,000,000, but Israeli exports to the Palestinian territories were exempted from import duties. Since internal economic growth is hampered by Israeli restrictions, and, to compensate, 40% of the Palestinian economy relies on international aid, it is argued that such aid constitutes a subsidy to the occupation itself, making it "one of the cheapest occupations", for Israel.
The Paris Protocol undersigned in 1994 allowed Israel to collect VAT on all Palestinian imports and good from that country or in transit through its ports, with the system of clearance revenue giving it effective control over roughly 75% of PA income. Israel can withhold that revenue as a punitive measure, as it did in response to the decision by the PA to adhere to the International Criminal Court in 2015.

A 2009 World Bank study concluded that "Very few economies have faced such a comprehensive array of obstacles to investment -- not just of physical impediments to movement, but also comprehensive institutional and administrative barriers to economies of scale and natural resources, along with an unclear political horizon and the inability to predictably plan movement of people and goods".

Communications

Under the Oslo Accords, Israel agreed that the Palestinian territories had a right to construct and operate an independent communications network. In 2016 a World Bank analysis concluded the provisions of this agreement had not been applied, causing notable detrimental effects to Palestinian development. It took 8 years for Israel to agree to a request for frequencies for 3G services, though they were limited, causing a bottleneck which left Israeli competitors with a distinct market advantage. The local Wataniya mobile operator's competitiveness suffered from Israeli restrictions and delays, and illegal Israeli operators in the West Bank, with 4G services available by that date, still maintained an unfair advantage over Palestinian companies. Israel imposes three other constraints that hamper Palestinian competitiveness: restrictions are imposed on imports of equipment for telecom and ICT companies, and movement to improve the development and maintenance of infrastructure in Area C, and finally, Palestinian telecommunications accessing international links must go through companies with Israeli registration. From 2008 to 2016, they concluded, progress in negotiating resolutions to these problems had been "very slim".

Overall economic costs
A joint study by the Palestinian Ministry of National Economy and researchers at the Applied Research Institute–Jerusalem argued that by 2010 the costs of occupation amounted in 2010 alone rose to 84.9% of the total Palestinian GDP ($US 6.897 billion). Their estimate for 2014 states that the total economic cost of Israel's occupation amounted to 74.27% of Palestinian nominal GDP, or some $(US) 9.46 billion. The cost to Israel's economy by 2007 was estimated at $50 billion.

Indirect costs to Israel
The indirect cost to the Israeli economy for defense outlays and maintaining operations in the territories has also been substantial. One analysis has concluded that the costs of maintaining Israel's occupation is a contributing factor to the rise of poverty in Israel, where poverty levels have jumped from one in ten families in the 1970s, compared to one in five at present. The high costs of subsidizing the settlement project shifted investment from Israel's development towns on its periphery and led to cutbacks in sectors like health care, education and welfare.
The settlement surge under Begin's Likud government was detrimental to housing development for Israelis in Israel: 44% of the entire budget of the Ministry of Housing and Construction in 1982 went to West Bank settlements. The substitution of imported foreign labour for Palestinians has also arguably lowered the bargaining power of Israeli blue-collar workers. In the aftermath of the Second Intifada, the budgetary allocations for Israel's social security net were reduced drastically: between 2001 and 2005 as defense outlays ratcheted up, child allowances were cut by 45%, unemployment compensation by 47%, and income maintenance by 25%. The annual growth, NIS 4.6 billion, in the defence budget for the decade 2007 onwards recommended by the Brodet Commission was close to Israel's total annual expenditure on higher education. Defense specialists also claim that guarding settlers lowers the combat readiness of soldiers, since they have far less time to train. It is also argued that the logic of settlements undermines Israel's rule of law.

Indirect economic gain to Israel 
The high-tech security and urban warfare systems, and the surveillance devices developed while securing the occupation particularly during the Al-Aqsa Intifada, have turned Israel into one of the major exporters of such systems in the world. Israel has become a pioneering leader in the manufacture of drones, border surveillance sensors, with the commercial advantage of having these devices "battle-tested" in the "laboratories" of the occupied territory.

Cultural impact
Many studies, following the work of Daniel Bar-Tal and Gavriel Salomon, have analyzed the emergence and consolidation of an "ethos of conflict", one of what they see as three key components of Israeli Jewish society – the others being collective memory of the conflict and collective emotional orientations – which have developed to cope with the stress of an intractable conflict. This complex can be broken down into eight societal values informing a unilateral outlook: (a) The justice of Israel's cause; (b) Security (including national survival) (c) Positive collective ethnocentric in-group images; (d) One's Own Victimization; (e) Delegitimizing the adversary by denying their humanity, allowing one to harm them; (f) Patriotism; (g) Beliefs reinforcing social solidarity, by ignoring internal disagreements; (h) Belief that peace is the goal. Recent research suggests that four of these – the persistence of a sense of historic trauma and an ethos of conflict (delegitimization of the opponent, security, own victimization and justness of one's own goals) – consistently influence decision-making on the conflict in the Israeli Supreme Court itself. The same model has been applied to Palestinian society, emphasizing that of all themes patriotism in the form of mūqāwama (resistance and readiness for self-sacrifice) form the keynote of Palestinian identity.

Wider implications
In 1981, Ya'akov Meridor stated Israel aspired to play the role of "top proxy" for the United States in Central America. By 1984, according to Jan Nederveen Pieterse, Israel had become one of the world's major arms exporters, the largest arms supplier to Central America and Sub-Saharan Africa, and globally active in the business of counterinsurgency, expertise in which was gained in enforcing land expropriations and settlements in the West Bank, the Gaza Strip and the Galilee. Knowledge of this background, he argued, was useful for assessing Israel's "export" of its methods, to countries like Guatemala, Honduras, Nicaragua, El Salvador and Sri Lanka, in some of which existed similar configurations of policy involving land, domination and exploitation, population policy, and terror. One settlement project in Costa Rica for example is thought to be based on Israeli expertise honed in West Bank projects.

The Israeli techniques of urban warfare against Palestinians in their towns and villages territories has influenced many other military powers. Many argue that Israeli methods developed in their conflict with Palestinians have been a significant influence on U.S. military doctrines developed under the administration of George W. Bush. The American claim that new methods developed for the war on terror were necessary since the situation was unprecedented and therefore was a legal no man's land had a precedent in Israeli claims the war on terror in the West Bank was a legal terra nulla, and thus allowed approaches like extrajudicial and preemptive assassination, a terminology already used by Israel with regard to its approach to resistance in the West Bank and Gaza. Jeff Halper has spoken of the risk of "Palestinizing" the American people as Israel has deepened its training programs for American police forces.

Hoover Institution Fellow and Senior Fellow at the Joint Special Operations University Thomas H. Henriksen writes that:
The Israel Defense Forces' (IDF) military actions have been – and are – a crucible for methods, procedures, tactics, and techniques for the United States, which faces a similarly fanatical foe across the world in the Global War on Terror... Israeli experiences offer an historical record and a laboratory for tactics and techniques in waging counter-insurgencies or counterterrorist operations in America's Post-9/11 circumstances.

Notes

Citations

Sources

 
1967 establishments in Israel
1967 in military history
June 1967 events in Asia
Israeli–Palestinian conflict
West Bank
Six-Day War
West Bank